The 1979 BYU Cougars football team represented Brigham Young University (BYU) for the 1979 NCAA Division I-A football season. The Cougars were led by eighth-year head coach LaVell Edwards and played their home games at Cougar Stadium in Provo, Utah. The team competed as a member of the Western Athletic Conference, winning the conference title for the fourth consecutive year with a conference record of 7–0. BYU finished the regular season with an undefeated record of 11–0. BYU was invited to the 1979 Holiday Bowl, where they lost to Indiana. They were ranked 13th in the final AP Poll and 12th in the final Coaches Poll.

Schedule

Personnel

Season summary

vs. Texas A&M

The game was played at Rice Stadium because Kyle Field was being renovated.

QB Marc Wilson had undergone an emergency appendectomy and had lost weight during the week of the game.

The defense carried the offense that was still finding its rhythm with a blocked punt and a goal line stand. The ailing Wilson drove BYU down the field to score with 52 seconds left to pull within 17-16. Coach Edwards let the team decide whether to go for the tie or the win and they chose the latter. The attempt was converted and BYU put itself in the national spotlight with a major upset.

Utah

    
    
    
    
    

Marc Wilson threw for 374 yards as BYU clinched at least a share of the WAC title and set up a showdown with San Diego State for the following week. Wilson set an NCAA record for the most passing yards against a single opponent in two games and tied Rice's Tommy Kramer 1976 record for 300-yard passing games in a season with seven.

Game 12: Holiday Bowl (vs. Indiana)

Marc Wilson 28/43, 380 yards, 2 TD, TD rushing

References

BYU
BYU Cougars football seasons
Western Athletic Conference football champion seasons
BYU Cougars football